The 1974 Oklahoma gubernatorial election was held on November 5, 1974, and was a race for Governor of Oklahoma. Democrat David Boren defeated Clem McSpadden in a run-off to claim his party's nomination after embattled incumbent David Hall was eliminated in the initial primary.  Boren won the general election handily over Republican Jim Inhofe. 20 years later, Inhofe would succeed Boren as U.S. Senator from Oklahoma.

Democratic primary

Candidates
 David Hall
 David Boren
 Clem Rogers McSpadden

Results

Runoff

Republican primary

Candidates
 Jim Inhofe, Oklahoma state Senator
 Denzil D. Garrison

Results

Results

References

1974
Gubernatorial
Okla